William M. Gillespie (April 19, 1928 – July 5, 2008) was an American politician and attorney in the state of Florida.

Gillespie was born in Daytona Beach, Florida. He attended the University of Florida, Florida State University, and law school at Stetson University. He served in the Florida House of Representatives from 1966 to 1972 for district 10. He is a member of the Democratic Party. His father James U. Gillespie also served in the Florida House of Representatives from 1939 to 1941.

References

2008 deaths
1928 births
Democratic Party members of the Florida House of Representatives
20th-century American politicians